Belvidere Cemetery is a cemetery located in Belvidere, in Warren County, New Jersey that was founded in 1834. It includes many graves of people who fought in the American Revolutionary War.

Notable interments
 Charlie Berry (1902–1972), Major League Baseball catcher from 1925–1938; MLB umpire; NFL linesman.
 Henry S. Harris (1850–1902), U.S. Representative from New Jersey's 4th congressional district, 1881–83.
 John Patterson Bryan Maxwell (1804–1845), U.S. Representative from New Jersey at-large, 1837–39, 1841–43.
 George M. Robeson (1829–1897), Union general during the Civil War, Secretary of the Navy during the Ulysses S. Grant presidency.
 Onion John Local hermit and Character of a book of the same name.

References

External links
  Belvidere Cemetery: famous names at Find a Grave
 Political Graveyard: Belvidere Cemetery

Belvidere, New Jersey
Cemeteries in Warren County, New Jersey
1834 establishments in New Jersey